Social sorting is understood as the breakdown and categorization of group- or person-related raw data into various categories and segments by data manipulators and data brokers. Social sorting involves the key task of separating one group from the other. These groups can be based on income, education, race, ethnicity, gender, occupation, social status, derived power (social and political) and geographic residence. Depending on the goals of the manipulator raw data is collected and then further evolves into meaningful data in order to be exploited for a specific purpose. For example, the formulation of profiling and predictive policing are all derivations of social sorting.

History

The concept is accredited to David Lyon, a sociologist who is best known for his work in surveillance studies. Contemporary times have allowed for the influx and constant growth of data collection especially in the countries of the global north. A prime example of social terming is surveillance. This practice was not always as sophisticated as today. Historically, simple tools such as labor-intensive watchers, book keeping and record keeping acted as the enablers of this form. Surveillance is now done by governments and various organizations. This technological tools that are equipped with surveillance are cameras, records of transactions done at banking machines and point of sale terminals, machine readable passports before boarding, cellular phone calls along with many other examples. This collection of raw data then enables trends to be found and the fostering of predictions.

In other contextual fashion, social sorting bears much of its resemblance to social stratification. In primitive societies there are evidence of the roots of social sorting where the sexual division of labour was concerned. Women would do most of the gathering where men would concentrate on hunting. It was argued that although this specific task of the woman may point to domestic oppression according to some observers, hunter-gatherer women would not understand this interpretation. The primitive society did show groupings and deployed categorization which perhaps without their own understanding of the understanding of the social construct was still insinuated.

Further confirmation of social sorting was evident through slavery. The racial divide between whites and blacks manifested for generations. Based on the visual appearance of their skin people of a darker complexion were grouped and made to endure hardships that included beatings, laborious field work, confinement and executions. A prime example of social sorting at work during the African slave era were mullatos were grouped together to perform household and other domestic work.

Criticism

Criticisms are often directed at the laws, implemented rules, educational system, job employment opportunities and at the government. Questions are asked of the integrity of many socially constructed programs led by private and government institutions. Fairness and equity are thought to be at the forefront of the list of frustrations for many people that are aware of social sorting.

There are paranoias and indifferences in regards to social sorting. The September 11 attacks and the subsequent war on terror have fueled the desire for categorizing and profiling people. The beneficiaries that are associated with it are evident as it allows for a more transparent viewership. Some researchers such as David Lyon are concerned with the rise of big data as there are many implication on the daily lives of many.

According to David Lyon, Canadians are still unaware of the fact that surveillance which goes collaboratively with social sorting is now very much integrated into their daily lives. David Lyon discusses that the systematic routines and attention to personal detail which is encompassed into surveillance. The key criticism involves indifferent treatment to individuals based on their profile. Depending on the details of a person it can lead to the determination of whether the person may end up on a No Fly List.

Employers have now begun to engage in these screening methods to determine a person’s suitability for a particular job. Law enforcement bodies and insurance companies have now all began to utilize social sorting to their use in order to determine whether their services should be offered or rescinded. The lives of many are directly affected as they are placed into socio-economic niches.

David Lyon insinuates that social sorting through surveillance is a modern threat to freedom. Byproducts of social sorting are isolation, segregation and marginalization. Social sorting has called into account issues that primarily involve equity and fairness. Different societies sort in different ways.

Other societies across the world engage in their own forms of social sorting. Some eastern countries such as China and India place much emphasis on an individual’s level of education. Blue collar jobs which at times may be dirty and laborious are often scorned and met with resentment. Low hourly wages, limited to zero prestige and little respect are directed at individuals who are involved in these occupational roles. Furthermore, the perception and low economic advantages hinder the progression of many people. At times, it acts as a domino effect where when one falls other problems come with it. For example, low education may not contribute to a good paying job; this may in turn lead to low income which may in turn lead to residing in a low class neighbourhood.

Wilson & McBrier (2005) conducted a longitudinal study based on the theory of minority vulnerability of employees. These constitute to a group of African Americans who work for good financial income in the upper tier for relatively privileged jobs. "The minority vulnerability thesis, accordingly, maintains that African Americans are more likely to experience layoffs from upper-tier occupations than Whites even when the two groups have similar background socioeconomic statuses, have accumulated similar human-capital credentials, such as educational attainment and commitment to work, and have similar job/labor market characteristics, including union status as well as economic sector of employment. Findings indicate that, after controlling for seniority, African Americans are susceptible to layoffs on a relatively broad and generalized basis that is unstructured by traditional, stratification-based causal factors, namely, background socioeconomic status, human-capital credentials, and job/labor-market characteristics."

Schools are accredited differing levels of prestige in comparison to other institutions. Social sorting occurs amongst schools where claims are made about learning experiences and which institutions may be the best for learning all of which are left up to subjection. For example, Princeton, and Harvard are all highly rated prestigious universities for various reasons. These perceptions cause employers and students alike to question the credibility and graduate documentation based on the institution that one attends.

In 2015, The Data Broker Accountability and Transparency Act was resurrected by four U.S senators that would allow consumers to see and correct personal information held by data brokers and tell those businesses to stop sharing or selling it for marketing purposes.

References and further reading 

Biesele, M. 1993. Women Like Meat. The folklore and foraging ideology of the Kalahari Ju/'hoan. Witwatersrand: University Press.
http://www.espncricinfo.com/southafrica/content/story/863161.html
http://journals1.scholarsportal.info/pdf/08848971/v20i0002/301_ralopaojlfuo.xml
http://cognet.mit.edu/book/sorting-things-out
https://www.youtube.com/watch?v=xtAa-f-1rTg
http://www.universityaffairs.ca/news/news-article/researchers-concerned-by-the-rise-of-big-data-surveillance/
http://www.computerworld.com/article/2893693/lawmakers-target-data-brokers-in-privacy-bill.html

Business intelligence
Social status